Agriotes lineatus is a species of beetle in the genus of Agriotes from the family of Elateridae. It is commonly known as the lined click beetle.

Description
Beetle in length . Agriotes lineatus upperbody is mid-brown color. Not so frequent in Scotland, that is more common in England, Wales.
This species pronotum and elytra look rounded. Mostly the insect's parts lighter than its legs and antennae. The insect's head and pronotum are much shorter than its antennae.

References

External links
Information and Images of Agriotes lineatus

Elateridae
Beetles of Europe
Beetles described in 1767
Taxa named by Carl Linnaeus